Pulpally is a mid-sized town in Wayanad District of Kerala, India.Pulpally also known as 'The land of black gold'. Pulpally is also famous for its pure wild Wayanad honey. The only Seetha devi temple in Kerala is situated on Pulpally. Geographically a small town in Sultan Bathery Taluk and a "Grama Panchayath" under the local self governance system. It is about 24 km from Sultan Bathery, and is almost surrounded by forest. The main source of income is agriculture.

History
About 7 km from Pulpally is the place of death of Pazhassi Raja who led the famous Pazhassi Revolt against the East India Company during the 18th century and was killed on 30 November 1805. The death place of pazhassi Raja is called mavilanthodu near vandikadavu.

Economy

Agriculture is the main economic activity of people. Major crops are pepper, rubber, coconut, ginger, rice, vanilla. arecanut, and coffee. Even most of the people are dependent on pepper agriculture. Pulpally also known as 'The land of black gold'. Pulpally is also famous for its pure wild wayanad honey.

Places of interest

One of the main attractions of Pulpally is the Kabani River. Kabani is one of the three rivers flowing to the east in Kerala. Others are Pambar and Bhavani. The important places are
Seetha Lava Kusa Kshethram
Kurua Island
Edakkal Caves
Suchippara Waterfalls
Muthanga Wildlife Sanctuary
Pazhassi Tomb, Mananthavady
kabani river, perikaloor
pazhassi smarakam at mavilanthodu
Pakkam srambi
Kurumbalakotta

Major Colleges

പഴശ്ശിരാജ College
SNDP Yogam Arts & Science College
Jayasree Arts & Science College

Schools

Vijaya Higher Secondary School
Government Higher Secondary School Kappiset
Jayasree Higher Secondary School
Devi vilasam Vocational Higher Secondary School-Veliyambam
St. Mary's Higher Secondary School - Mullankolly
St. Mary's English Medium High School
Marutha Vidyalayam English Medium High School
St. George LP & Up School, Christ Nagar
St. George UP School, Elephant Rock.
Kripalaya Special School
Amrita vidyalayam School

Shopping

It's the local commercial hub for the domiciliates of the surrounding areas of Pulpally. All kinds of essentials such as Grocery, Textiles, Home Appliances, Electronics, Computers, Electricals, Building Materials, Stationary, Agriculture products, Heavy metals, Automobiles are available here.

Places of worships

St. George Jacobite Simhasana Cathedral Pulpally
Eldho Mor Baselious Jacobite Church Cheeyambam (Pilgrim Center)
St. Mary's Jacobite Simhasana Church Chettappalam
St. Mary's Jacobite Simhasana Church Pattanikkoop
St. Mary's Jacobite Church Manikode
Holy Kings Jacobite Chapel Manikkadu
St George Malankara Catholic Church Christ Nagar 
Seetha Lava kusa Kshethram
Jadayatta Kavu
Town Church (Sacred Heart Church)
Town Juma Masjid
Sisumala Seetha Devi Kshethram
St.Marys Malankara Church Sisumala
Ferona Church Mullankolly
Veliyambam Kotta - Siva Kshethram
Sisumala Infant Jesus Church & kurishumala
St. Thomas Marakav Church
Christian Brethren Assembly Pulpally Town
Christian Brethren Assembly kurichipatta, Chettapalam etc.
 Assemblies of God - Penthacostal Church - Pulpally Thazathagadi
 IPC - Indian Penthacostal Church - Aanappara, Pulpally
 Church of God, Penthacostal Church, Thanitheruv, Pulpally.

Festivals
The Machur village across the Kabani river has good tourist potential as it is in the very middle of forest area. A large number of devotees come to visit the Gundara Dargah at Machur. The Veda Gowda tribe of Bavali area celebrate the Moori Abba or Ori Abba festival on the new moon day after Deepavali. Centuries ago, this tribe fled from Chitradurga district because of the persecution of Tippu Sultan. The purpose of this celebration is the prosperity of their crops. The festisval begins with nadi Pooja and a bullock race is also conducted. The bullocks are paraded before the Sree Basaveshwara Temple at Dodda Bairankuppa which is only 10 km away from the Kerala town of Pulpally.
Mor Baselious Jacobite Syrian Church, Cheeyambam, Pulpally on foot pilgrimage from churches in Malabar on fest of St.Yeldho Mar Baselios, It is also known as one and only all religious pilgrim center

Transportation
Pulpally can be accessed from Mananthavady or Sultan Battery. The Periya ghat road connects Mananthavady to Kannur and Thalassery.  The Thamarassery mountain road connects Calicut with Kalpetta. The Kuttiady mountain road connects Vatakara with Kalpetta and Mananthavady. The Palchuram mountain road connects Kannur and Iritty with Mananthavady.  The road from Nilambur to Ooty is also connected to Wayanad through the village of Meppadi.

The nearest railway station is at Nanjangudu (Near Mysore)  and the nearest airports are Mysore airport 107 km (not for passenger flite)Kozhikode International Airport-120 km, Bengaluru International Airport-290 km, and   Kannur International Airport, 58 km. nangangud nilambur railway project and wayanad airport awaited..

Notable people 
 Sibi Pulpally: Kerala Lalithakala Akademi photography award winner 2009

Image Gallery

References

Sultan Bathery area
Villages in Wayanad district
Cities and towns in Wayanad district